"She La" is a song by Canadian rock group 54-40, released as the second single from the band's 1992 album, Dear Dear. The song peaked at No. 38 on the RPM Canadian Singles Chart.

Track listing
She La
You Don't Get Away (That Easy)
Book

Music video
The music video for "She La" was directed by Curtis Wehrfritz. The video won the award for "Best Video" at the 1992 MuchMusic Video Awards. The video was also nominated for "Best Video" at the 1993 Juno Awards.

References

External links

1992 singles
54-40 songs
1992 songs
Columbia Records singles